A constitutional referendum was held in Djibouti on 4 September 1992. The new constitution would restore multi-party democracy for the first time since independence. A second question asked voters whether the number of political parties should be limited to four. Both were approved by over 97.9% of voters with a 75.2% turnout. The first multi-party elections were held in December that year.

Results

New constitution

Limit of four political parties

References

1992 referendums
1992
1992 in Djibouti
Constitutional referendums
September 1992 events in Africa